Jan Mikael Källström (born 26 February 1959) is a Swedish football coach and former footballer. He made 57 Allsvenskan appearances for Gefle IF and BK Häcken and scored eight goals.

He is the father of Swedish international footballer Kim Källström. He is the brother of Swedish footballer Jonas Källström. He appeared for the Sweden U19 team a total of 11 times.

In 2011, he became acting manager in Sandefjord Fotball

References

Swedish footballers
Gefle IF players
BK Häcken players
1959 births
Living people
Sandefjord Fotball managers
Allsvenskan players
Association football midfielders
Swedish football managers